Talk Talk were an English band that released five studio albums, one live album, eight compilation albums, 25 singles, one EP, and two live video releases. All of their studio albums were released under EMI/Parlophone Records with the exception of their final album, which was released under Verve/Polydor.

Albums

Studio albums

Live albums

Remix albums

Compilation albums

EPs

Singles

Videos

Video albums

Music videos

Notes

References

Discographies of British artists
Rock music group discographies
New wave discographies